The Andantes were an American female session group for the Motown record label during the 1960s. Composed of Jackie Hicks, Marlene Barrow, and Louvain Demps, the group sang background vocals on numerous Motown recordings, including songs by Martha Reeves & the Vandellas, the Temptations, Stevie Wonder, the Four Tops, Jimmy Ruffin, Edwin Starr, the Supremes, the Marvelettes, Marvin Gaye and the Isley Brothers, among others. It is estimated they appeared on 20,000 recordings. 

The Andantes provided back-up singing on Motown singles starting in 1962. The group was most prominently used on all of the Four Tops' Holland–Dozier–Holland-produced hits, including "Baby I Need Your Loving", "I Can't Help Myself (Sugar Pie Honey Bunch)", "Reach Out I'll Be There", and more. Motown began to use the Andantes as background vocal substitutes for the vast majority of recordings for its girl groups beginning with the Marvelettes recordings in 1965, Martha & the Vandellas in 1966, and major part of the Supremes recordings between 1968-1969 although Mary Wilson and Cindy Birdsong continued to record. 

In 1963, the Andantes, with the Marvelettes, released the single "Too Hurt to Cry, Too Much in Love to Say Goodbye" b/w "Come on Home" as credited to the Darnells. In 1964 they released a single of their own called "(Like A) Nightmare" b/w "If You Were Mine", though none of the actual Andantes sang lead on either track (future Marvelette Ann Bogan performed the lead vocals).

The Andantes are also featured on some records that were not produced by Motown Records, the most prominent example being Jackie Wilson's "(Your Love Keeps Lifting Me) Higher and Higher" (Pat Lewis substitutes for Louvain Demps on this track).
In addition to various awards, the Andantes were inducted into the Rhythm and Blues Music Hall of Fame in August 2014.

Barrow died on February 23, 2015, at the age of 73.

Motown
Throughout the 1960s and early 1970s, the Andantes appeared as backing vocalists on many of Motown's recorded singles, as the Funk Brothers also had when providing instrumentation. Seven of these singles that they provided background vocals for would go on to chart at the number one position on the Billboard Hot 100 popular music chart.

Chart-topping hits
 "My Guy" – Mary Wells
 "Stop! In the Name of Love – The Supremes 
 "I Can't Help Myself (Sugar Pie Honey Bunch)" – Four Tops
 "Reach Out I'll Be There" – Four Tops
 "Love Child" – Diana Ross & the Supremes
 "I Heard It Through the Grapevine" – Marvin Gaye
 "Ain't No Mountain High Enough" – Diana Ross

Brenda Holloway
The Andantes appeared on many singles for Brenda Holloway. These include:
 "When I'm Gone"
 "Operator"
 "You Can Cry on My Shoulder"
 "Together 'Til the End of Time"
 "Just Look What You've Done"

The Four Tops
The Andantes appeared as backing vocalists on 16 singles for the Four Tops. These releases include:
 "Baby I Need Your Loving"
 "Without the One You Love (Life's Not Worth While)"
 "Ask the Lonely"
 "I Can't Help Myself (Sugar Pie Honey Bunch)"
 "It's the Same Old Song"
 "Something About You"
 "Shake Me, Wake Me (When It's Over)"
 "Reach Out I'll Be There"
 "Standing in the Shadows of Love"
 "Bernadette"
 "7-Rooms of Gloom"
 "You Keep Running Away"
 "I'm in a Different World"
 "Still Water (Love)"
 "Walk Away Renee"
 "If I Were a Carpenter"

The Supremes
They appeared as backing vocalists on seven singles for The Supremes. These releases include:
 "Stop! In the Name of Love"
 "Children's Christmas Song"
 "In and Out of Love"
 "Forever Came Today"
 "Love Child"
 "I'm Livin' in Shame"
 "The Composer"

Martha & the Vandellas
They appeared as backing vocalists on twelve singles for Martha & the Vandellas. These releases include:
 "You've Been in Love Too Long"
 "Love (Makes Me Do Foolish Things)" (B-Side of "You've Been in Love Too Long")
 "My Baby Loves Me" (with the Four Tops)
 "I'm Ready for Love"
 "Jimmy Mack"
 "I Promise to Wait My Love"
 "Forget Me Not" (B-Side of "I Promise to Wait My Love")
 "I Can't Dance to That Music You're Playin'" (with Syreeta Wright)
 "(We've Got) Honey Love"
 "Taking My Love (And Leaving Me)"
 "I Should Be Proud"

The Marvelettes
They appeared as backing vocalists on 15 singles for the Marvelettes. These releases include:
 "Tie a String Around Your Finger" (B-side of "As Long as I Know He's Mine")
 "A Need For Love" (B-side of "Too Many Fish in the Sea")
 "I'll Keep Holding On"
 "Don't Mess with Bill"
 "You're The One"
 "The Hunter Gets Captured by the Game"
 "When You're Young and in Love"
 "My Baby Must Be a Magician"
 "Here I Am Baby"
 "Destination: Anywhere"
 "What's Easy for Two Is So Hard for One"
 "I'm Gonna Hold On As Long As I Can"
 "That's How Heartaches Are Made"
 "Marionette"
 "A Breath-Taking Guy"

The Temptations
They appeared as backing vocalists on six recordings for the Temptations.
 "It's Growing"
 "Get Ready"
 "Last One Out is Broken Hearted"
 "Just Another Lonely Night"
 "All I Need" 
 "That'll Be the Day"
 "Love Woke Me Up This Morning"

Marvin Gaye
They appeared as backing vocalists on (at least) 15 singles for Marvin Gaye. These releases include:
 "Baby Don't You Do It"
 "What Good Am I Without You"
 "How Sweet It Is (To Be Loved by You)"
 "I'll Be Doggone"
 "Pretty Little Baby"
 "Ain't That Peculiar"
 "One More Heartache"
 "Take This Heart of Mine"
 "Little Darling (I Need You)"
 "Your Unchanging Love"
 "I Heard It Through the Grapevine"
 "Too Busy Thinking About My Baby"
 "That's the Way Love Is"
 "The End of Our Road"
 "Save the Children"

Marvin Gaye & Tammi Terrell
They also appeared as backing vocalists on these following recordings and singles for Marvin Gaye & Tammi Terrell:
 "This Poor Heart Of Mine"
 "Give In, You Just Can't Win"
 "When Love Comes Knocking At My Heart"
 "Two Can Have A Party"
 "Come On And See Me"
 "Oh How I'd Miss You"
 "Love Woke Me Up This Morning"

Stevie Wonder 

The Andantes have also appeared as backing vocalists on numerous Stevie Wonder recordings, including:

 "Sunset" (B-side of "Contract on Love")
 "Kiss Me Baby"
 "Music Talk" (B-side of "Hi-Heel Sneakers")
 "Uptight (Everything's Alright)"
 "Nothing's Too Good For My Baby"
 "A Place in the Sun"
 "Hey Love"
 "I Was Made to Love Her"
 "I'm Wondering"
 "Shoo-Be-Doo-Be-Doo-Da-Day"
 "For Once in My Life"
 "Yester-Me, Yester-You, Yesterday"

Non-Motown recordings

Much like the Funk Brothers, The Andantes also appear on several notable recordings produced and/or released by record companies outside of Motown, including:

 "Come On" - The Distants
 "All Right" - The Distants
 "Your Love" - Billy Kent
 "He Gave Me You" - Marv Johnson
 The Big Soul of John Lee Hooker - John Lee Hooker (with Mary Wilson)
 "Prince of Players" - Betty Everett
 "To Win Your Heart" - Laura Lee
 "Agent Double-O-Soul" - Edwin Starr
 "Whispers (Gettin' Louder)" - Jackie Wilson
 "(Your Love Keeps Lifting Me) Higher and Higher" - Jackie Wilson (Pat Lewis substitutes for group member Louvain Demps)
 The Andantes also appear on much of the accompanying Higher and Higher album
 "I Get the Sweetest Feeling" - Jackie Wilson

Motorcity Records
As part of the Ian Levine's Motorcity Records project in the late 1980s and early 1990s, the Andantes were signed to the label and once again provided a service in recording backing vocals to former Motown artists. By this time, Pat Lewis had joined Jackie Hicks, Barrow and Demps (from 1989 to 1992).

Levine also recorded several songs with the Andantes, issuing a new single "Lightning Never Strikes Twice", which featured Demps on lead vocals. Most other songs recorded by the group at Motorcity had Lewis on lead vocals.

Motorcity recordings
Original recordings
 "Lightning Never Strikes Twice"
 "Hurricane"
 "Throw Love Away"
 "Step Into My Shoes" – also recorded by Martha Reeves and the Vandellas
 "Two Sides Of Love"
 "One Drop Of Rain"
 "Will You Always Be There"
 "Love Is A Bumpy Road"
 "All Around the Motorcity"

Cover versions
 "Girls Are Out To Get You"
 "Superstition"
 "Mercy, Mercy Me"
 "I Wish" – cover of the Stevie Wonder classic
 "My World Is Empty Without You"
 "The Boss"
 "Last Dance"
 "Little Darlin'"
 "Why Am I Loving You"

Unreleased tracks
 "Back In My Arms Again"
 "In And Out Of Love"
 "I Wish It Would Rain"
 "Waste of Time" (Instrumental only)

Louvain Demps – Better Times

Whilst under contract to Motorcity Records, Louvain was given the opportunity to step up to the microphone and record a full album, which was released in 1992 under the title Better Times, which includes original tunes and one cover of the Diana Ross hit "Reach Out and Touch (Somebody's Hand)".

 "On the Front Page"
 "Better times"
 "One Shot At Happiness"
 "Lost & Found"
 "Good Intentions"
 "Blind Love"
 "On the Beach"
 "My Heart Won't Say No"
 "No Time For Tears"
 "Reach Out & Touch Somebody's Hand"

Louvain recorded two further tracks with Motorcity which did not appear on the above album:

 "On Top Of the Mountain"
 "Sight And Sound"

Pat Lewis

Ian Levine has cited that he has recorded more songs with Pat Lewis than with any other artist. Several songs recorded by Lewis whilst with Motorcity Records are:

Cover versions
 "I Want You Back"
 "Don't Leave Me This Way"
 "I'll Be There"
 "Selfish One"
 "Rescue Me"

Original recordings
 "No Right Turn"
 "Hungry For You"
 "Something's Telling Me"

Billboard Top Ten hit songs (US pop chart)

Billboard Top Forty hit songs (US pop chart)

References

External links 
"Lighting Never Strikes Twice" re-recording on YouTube
Biography on Billboard.com 
Biography on Answers.com
The Andantes: The Girl Group Left Behind

Motown artists
American girl groups
Northern soul musicians
American soul musical groups